Northwest Orient Airlines Flight 293 was an American military charter operated on 3 June 1963 by a Northwest Orient Airlines Douglas DC-7C registered N290 which crashed into the sea off the coast of Alaska. All 101 crew and passengers on board were killed. It was the airline's deadliest disaster until the crash of Northwest Airlines Flight 255 24 years later.

Accident
Flight 293 was chartered by the Military Air Transport Service of the United States Air Force to carry 95 servicemen and their families from McChord Air Force Base in Washington state to Elmendorf Air Force Base in Alaska. The DC-7 departed McChord at 07:52 Pacific Standard Time. The last radio contact with the plane was at 10:06, when the crew requested a change of flight level. When nothing more had been heard for more than an hour, a search for the aircraft was begun at 11:16. It was not until 19:22 that floating debris was seen 182.5 miles (293.7 km) WSW of Annette Island, Alaska.

Approximately 1,500 pounds of wreckage was recovered, including life vests still encased in their plastic containers and extremely deformed seat frames. None of the bodies of the crew or passengers were ever recovered.

Investigation
With the wreckage under 8,000 feet of water, the Accident Review Board concluded that "Because of lack of evidence, the Board is unable to determine the probable cause of the accident."

Northwest Airlines Flight 293 Incident (1962)

A similar accident occurred on October 22, 1962, that is, seven months before this disaster, while both incidents almost completely coincided in a number of details. Douglas DC-7CF of Northwest Airlines, but N285, operated exactly the same flight 293 from McChord Air Force Base to Elmendorf Air Base, and on board were 95 passengers and 7 crew members. The flight took place at an altitude of 20 thousand feet. Then, after 3 hours from the moment of takeoff, the second engine (internal left) suddenly lost thrust, after which the propeller of this engine developed a speed higher than the permissible one. In this situation, the pilots transferred the aircraft to a rapid descent, and then made a successful splashdown in Sitka Bay (Alaska), none of the 102 people on board died. According to the commission, the cause of the accident was a technical failure in the second engine. There is some possibility that one of the engines also failed on board the N290, after which the aircraft went out of control of the crew.

References

Notes

Aviation accidents and incidents in 1963
Accidents and incidents involving the Douglas DC-7
Airliner accidents and incidents in Alaska
Airliner accidents and incidents with an unknown cause
293
1963 in Alaska
June 1963 events in the United States